Lewisburg Historic District is a national historic district located at Lewisburg, Greenbrier County, West Virginia.  The district encompasses 112 contributing buildings and are representative of the development and evolution of Lewisburg, over a period of more than two centuries (1763-1977).  Notable buildings include log cabins dating to the period 1755–1769, "The Barracks," Mount Esperance (1814), Williams-Henning Store/house (1814-1820), Welch-Bell House (1824), John W. Dunn House (c. 1834), John Withrow's Store/ House (1836), Greenbrier Valley Bank Building (1897), and Carnegie Hall (1902).   Located in the district and separately listed are the Old Stone Church, Greenbrier County Courthouse and Lewis Spring, John Wesley Methodist Church, Gov. Samuel Price House, Mt. Tabor Baptist Church, Supreme Court Library Building, James Withrow House, and John A. North House.

It was listed on the National Register of Historic Places in 1978.

References

Historic districts in Greenbrier County, West Virginia
Georgian architecture in West Virginia
Victorian architecture in West Virginia
Houses in Greenbrier County, West Virginia
National Register of Historic Places in Greenbrier County, West Virginia
Bungalow architecture in West Virginia
American Craftsman architecture in West Virginia
Commercial buildings on the National Register of Historic Places in West Virginia
Houses on the National Register of Historic Places in West Virginia
Historic districts on the National Register of Historic Places in West Virginia
1978 establishments in West Virginia